Bruce Lake (born 9 June 1948) is a former Australian rules footballer who played with Essendon and Footscray in the Victorian Football League (VFL).

Lake, who came from Metung, made his league debut in the fifth round of the 1968 VFL season. Four rounds later he would be joined in the side by his younger brother Eddie.

Although primarily a forward, Lake was also used as a ruckman and was Essendon's 19th man in the 1968 VFL Grand Final.

He switched to Footscray in 1971 but played just two games and finished the season at Waverley in the Victorian Football Association.

References

1948 births
Australian rules footballers from Victoria (Australia)
Essendon Football Club players
Western Bulldogs players
Waverley Football Club players
Living people